Turkish women writers refers to Turkish women contributors to Turkish literature. The area is parallel to Women's writing in English.

Pioneers
During the Ottoman era, there were only a few woman poets and novelists. Professor Nazan Bekiroğlu gives the priority to two woman poets; Zeynep Hatun and Mihri Hatun who lived in the 15th century.  But probably the best known woman poet was Fitnat Hanım of the 18th century. The first Ottoman novelists were Zafer Hanım who was the first author of a novel published in 1877 and Fatma Aliye who is considered by many as the first Turkish female novelist.  ( Hatun and Hanım are titles equivalent to "lady"). Fatma Aliye's sister Emine Semiye Önasya was also a novelist and textbook author.

Early Republican era
The number of women poets and novelists increased sharply during the Turkish Republic (after 1923). The first novelists during the Republican era were Azmiye Hami Güven, author of a novel, Hemșire Nimet (Nimet, the Nurse), and several published stories and Halide Edib Adıvar.

Anthologies in English
The Oxford Guide to Literature in English Translation (2001) notes a boom in women's writing, but notes that these writers have failed to attract attention outside Turkey. One of the first major anthologies of Turkish women authors was a collection translated by Nilüfer Mizanoğlu Reddy (1988).

Notable writers and poets

See also
List of Turkish women writers

Gallery

References

External links
 Türkiye'de Kadın Hareketleri ve Edebiyatımızda (Turkish) pdf